Astronesthes niger, commonly known as snaggletooth, is a species of small, deep sea fish in the family Stomiidae.

Description
Astronesthes niger is a slender, somewhat elongate, black fish with a large mouth, fang-like teeth, and a long barbel on its chin tipped by a knob. The dorsal fin has 15 to 17 soft rays and is set slightly behind the pelvic fins. There is a ventral adipose fin in front of the anus, and the anal fin has 12 to 15 soft rays. There are two longitudinal rows of photophores on either flank and there are luminous patches in front of the eye, above the nostrils, above the eye, and a large patch above the pectoral fin.

Distribution and habitat
The species is found in the mesopelagic zone of the tropical and subtropical Atlantic Ocean, the Caribbean Sea and the Gulf of Mexico, between about 40°N and the equator. It is also present in the western Pacific and the Indian Oceans.

Ecology
Astronesthes niger is a predator and feeds on krill, amphipods and lanternfishes. It appears to only rise to the very top layer of the water column when both the sun and moon are below the horizon, at about the periods of the month when the moon is in its first or third quarter phase; it appears that the fish needs the moon for its vertical migrations but avoids the surface when it is illuminated. Little is known about the reproduction of this fish and the development of its larvae.

References

Stomiidae
Fish described in 1845